Hurricane Danny was the first major hurricane to develop between the Lesser Antilles and Western Africa since Hurricane Julia in 2010. The fourth tropical cyclone, and first hurricane of the 2015 Atlantic hurricane season, Danny originated from a well-defined tropical wave that emerged over the Atlantic Ocean on August 14. Traveling west, the system gradually coalesced into a tropical depression by August 18. After becoming a tropical storm later that day, dry air slowed further development. On August 20–21, dry air became removed from the system, and Danny rapidly intensified into a Category 3 hurricane on the Saffir–Simpson hurricane wind scale. Its peak was short-lived as wind shear soon increased and prompted significant weakening. Degrading to a tropical storm by August 23, Danny approached the Lesser Antilles. It degenerated into a tropical wave as it traversed the archipelago on August 24 and was last noted over Hispaniola the following day.

The hurricane prompted the issuance of several tropical storm warnings for the Lesser Antilles. Leeward Islands Air Transport cancelled 40 flights and sandbags were distributed in the United States Virgin Islands. Danny ultimately only brought light rain to the region, with its effects considered beneficial due to a severe drought.

Meteorological history

On August 14, 2015, a well-defined tropical wave, accompanied by significant surface pressure falls, traversed Western Africa and emerged over the Atlantic Ocean that evening. A broad surface low developed along the wave on August 15. Embedded within monsoon flow, various environmental factors enabled gradual development of the disturbance, including low wind shear, above-average sea surface temperatures, moderate moisture content, and favorable diffluence. A subtropical ridge to the north steered the system generally west-northwest throughout its entire existence. On August 17, the surface low became increasingly defined and convection more persistent. It subsequently acquired enough organization to be classified a tropical depression at 06:00 UTC on August 18. At this time, it was situated about 825 mi (1,325 km) west-southwest of Praia, Cape Verde.

The depression traversed a region generally favoring further development; however, occasional intrusions of dry air from the Saharan Air Layer initially inhibited rapid growth. The system reached tropical storm-status by 12:00 UTC on August 18—based on satellite intensity estimates using the Dvorak Technique—and it was assigned the name Danny accordingly. Banding features developed around the circulation early on August 19. A temporary intrusion of dry air caused convection to collapse later that day, but cloud cover redeveloped within hours. Danny reached hurricane-strength by 12:00 UTC on August 20, by which time it was located 1,095 mi (1,760 km) east of the Windward Islands.

An unusually small hurricane, with gale-force winds extending only 60 mi (95 km) from its center, Danny was prone to significant fluctuations in intensity, making forecasts particularly difficult. Indeed, the storm soon underwent an unpredicted period of rapid intensification aided by nearly non-existent upper-level wind shear. Low-level moisture wrapped around the circulation during this phase, mitigating the influence of the Saharan air layer. Danny achieved its peak intensity around 12:00 UTC on August 21 as a Category 3 hurricane on the Saffir–Simpson hurricane wind scale; maximum sustained winds were estimated at 125 mph (205 km/h) alongside a barometric pressure of 960 mbar (hPa). Shortly thereafter, increasing shear and dry air initiated a rapid weakening phase. The storm's eye became obscured by clouds and disappeared from satellite image late on August 21.

Throughout August 22, Danny's structure deteriorated with its surface and mid-level circulations becoming tilted with height due to the shear. The surface low soon became exposed with convection displaced to the northeast, and Danny weakened to a tropical storm by 00:00 UTC on August 23. The storm briefly leveled off in intensity somewhat later that day, with its circulation back under convection; intense lightning was observed near the cyclone's center. Late on August 23, Danny's structure began degrading once more with its circulation becoming significantly displaced from the remaining ragged convection. Early on August 24, hurricane hunters struggled to find a circulation center as Danny neared the Lesser Antilles, and the system weakened to a tropical depression by 12:00 UTC as it passed between Guadeloupe and Dominica. Hours later it degenerated into a tropical wave, marking its dissipation as a tropical cyclone. The remnants of Danny continued to the west-northwest for another day and were last noted over Hispaniola.

Preparations and impact

On August 22, governments across the Lesser Antilles issued tropical storm watches. The islands of Antigua, Anguilla, Barbuda, Montserrat, Nevis, Saba, St. Eustatius, and St. Kitts were placed under a tropical storm warning the following day. These advisories were discontinued following Danny's degradation to a tropical depression on August 24. Leeward Islands Air Transport cancelled 40 flights across the eastern Caribbean due to the hurricane and cruise ships altered their courses. Although members of the Haiti Office of Civil Protection issued an official statement to residents saying Danny was not a threat to the country, they convened to discuss potential preparations and the status of emergency supplies. Officials in the United States Virgin Islands distributed sandbags and opened shelters. Météo-France issued an "orange" alert for Guadeloupe Saint Barthélemy, and Saint Martin, advising residents about heavy rain and strong winds. Officials in Guadeloupe shut down several roads a precautionary measure. The expected rainfall was welcomed across the entire affected region, which was suffering from a severe drought.

Some disruption to electrical and water supplies occurred on Guadeloupe. The Carraízo Dam, then at a critically low , received .

Just a few days after Danny, Tropical Storm Erika brought devastating floods to Dominica, killing 30 people and wrecking tremendous damage. Other Caribbean islands received additional rainfall from the storm.

See also

 Other storms of the same name
 Timeline of the 2015 Atlantic hurricane season
 List of Category 3 Atlantic hurricanes
 Tropical Storm Erika (2009) – Affected similar areas shortly after Danny did, causing catastrophic flooding in Dominica
 Hurricane Beryl (2018) – Another small, rapidly-developing tropical cyclone.

Notes

References

External links

The National Hurricane Center's advisory archive of Hurricane Danny
 for Hurricane Danny

2015 Atlantic hurricane season
Cape Verde hurricanes
Category 3 Atlantic hurricanes
Hurricanes in Antigua and Barbuda
Hurricanes in the British Virgin Islands
Hurricanes in Dominica
Hurricanes in Guadeloupe
Hurricanes in the United States Virgin Islands
2015 in Antigua and Barbuda
2015 in the British Virgin Islands
2015 in Dominica
2015 in Guadeloupe
2015 in the United States Virgin Islands
2015 in Saba (island)
2015 in Sint Eustatius
August 2015 events
August 2015 events in the United States
Tropical cyclones in 2015